ETHA Engomis (in Greek: Ε.Θ.Α. Έγκωμης ), is a Cypriot professional basketball club based in Engomi, Cyprus. The club competes in the Cypriot League.

History
The club was founded in 1942, but didn't win its first trophy until 2011. ETHA won at this year its first Cypriot Cup and also its first Cypriot League.

Players

Current roster

Notable players

External links
Official website

Basketball teams in Cyprus